Diamine acetyltransferase 2 is an enzyme that in humans is encoded by the SAT2 gene.
SAT2 maintains a key metabolic glutamine/glutamate balance underpinning retrograde signaling by dendritic release of the neurotransmitter glutamate.

References

Further reading